The 2020 Guaranteed Rate Skate America was the first event in the 2020–21 ISU Grand Prix of Figure Skating, a senior-level international invitational competition series. It was held at Orleans Arena in Las Vegas, Nevada on October 23–24. Medals were awarded in the disciplines of men's singles, ladies' singles, pair skating, and ice dance.

Due to the ongoing COVID-19 pandemic, a large number of modifications were made to the Grand Prix structure. The competitors consisted only of skaters from the home country, skaters already training in the host nation, and skaters assigned to that event for geographic reasons.

On September 25, 2020, U.S. Figure Skating announced that Skate America would be held without spectators present, in line with Nevada Gaming Control Board guidelines regarding the pandemic. Attendees at the competition remained in a bubble throughout the duration of the event.

Entries 
The International Skating Union announced the preliminary assignments on October 1, 2020.

Changes to preliminary assignments

Results

Men

Ladies

Pairs

Ice dance

References 

2020 Skate America
2020 in figure skating
2020 in American sports
October 2020 sports events in the United States
Sports competitions in the Las Vegas Valley